Thomas MacGillivray Humphrey (born 1935) is an American economist. Until 2005 he was a research advisor and senior economist in the research department of the Federal Reserve Bank of Richmond and editor of the Bank's flagship publication, the Economic Quarterly. His publications cover macroeconomics, monetary economics, and the history of economic thought. Mark Blaug called him the "undisputed master" of British classical monetary thought.

Writing and research

Humphrey has written books and journal articles on monetary policy history. He is the author of articles published in journals such as the Cato Journal, HOPE (History of Political Economy), Southern Economics Journal,  and Econ Focus (formerly Region Focus). He wrote over 70 articles published in the journals of the Richmond Federal Reserve. Articles by Humphrey such as Rival Notions of Money  may be freely accessed and downloaded at the Federal Reserve Bank of Richmond's website.

Humphrey was an editor of the Federal Reserve of Richmond Economic Quarterly, previously known as the Economic Review and before that as the Monthly Review. In 1998 his annual report for the Federal Reserve Bank of Richmond was Mercantilists and Classicals: Insights from Doctrinal History.

His first four books on the history of monetary thought were: The Monetary Approach to the Balance of Payments, Exchange Rates, and World Inflation (co-author Robert Keleher); Money, Banking and Inflation: Essays in the History of Monetary Thought;  Money, Exchange and Production: Further Essays in the History of Economic Thought; and Essays on Inflation. Charles R. McCann, Jr. stated, in reference to Humphrey's book Money, Banking and Inflation: Essays in the History of Monetary Thought that "monetary economists looking for an accessible introduction to their discipline's past will find few better starting points than this volume."

In 2019 The Cato Institute published his fifth book, Gold, the Real Bills Doctrine, and the Fed: Sources of Monetary Disorder – 1922–1938,   a collaboration between Humphrey and his co-author Richard H. Timberlake.

His writing on the history of economic thought was included in the first edition to the New Palgrave and in the later An Encyclopedia of Keynesian Economics to which he contributed an article on the Chicago School of Economics, and also in festschriften, book reviews, textbooks,  annual reports, and anthologies. For Famous Figures in Diagrams and Economics by Mark Blaug and Peter Lloyd, Humphrey wrote the first chapter,  Marshallian Cross Diagrams  and Chapter 55, Intertemporal utility maximization – the Fisher diagram. Humphrey's  works on monetary theory are cited in David Laidler's book Fabricating the Keynesian Revolution: Studies of the Inter-War Literature on Money, the Cycle, and Unemployment.

In 2006, Federal Reserve Chairman Ben S. Bernanke at the Fourth ECB Central Banking Conference, Frankfurt, Germany, cited Humphrey's article on the real bills doctrine. In 2008 Humphrey gave the Fourth Annual Ranlett Lecture in Economics at California State University, Sacramento, entitled Lender of Last Resort: The Concept in History. In 2009 Humphrey participated in the Adam Smith Program, Jepson School of Leadership Studies at the University of Richmond, where he presented The Fed's Deviation from Classical Thornton-Bagehot Lender-of-Last-Resort Policy, a paper co-authored with Richard Timberlake.
At the 2010 Annual Meeting of the American Economics Association (AEA) in Atlanta, Georgia, his subject was The Lender of Last Resort in the History of Economic Thought. In February 2013, he wrote Working Paper No. 751 Arresting Financial Crises: The Fed Versus the Classicals for the Levy Economics Institute of Bard College, an essay which was subsequently presented at the 2013 Annual Meeting in Philadelphia of the American Economics Association. He wrote reviews of books by other writers on economic subjects, such as Sylvia Nasar, Arie Arnon, and Robert W. Dimand's "Irving Fisher (Great Thinkers in Economics)".

Books
 The Monetary Approach to the Balance of Payments, Exchange Rates, and World Inflation (co-author Robert Keleher). 
 Money, Banking and Inflation: Essays in the History of Monetary Thought. 
 Money, Exchange, and Production: Further Essays in the History of Economic Thought. 
 Essays on Inflation. 
 Gold, the Real Bills Doctrine, and the Fed: Sources of Monetary Disorder 1922–1938. (co-author Richard H. Timberlake).

See also
 List of economists
 List of Tulane University people

References

20th-century American economists
21st-century American economists
1935 births
Living people
New classical economists
Tulane University alumni
Tulane University faculty
University of Tennessee alumni
University of Virginia faculty
Auburn University faculty
St. Andrews University (North Carolina) faculty
American people of Scottish descent
University of Georgia faculty
Duke University faculty
University of Mary Washington faculty
Presbyterian College faculty
Historians of economic thought
Monetarists
People from Louisville, Kentucky
Academics from Kentucky
Economists from Kentucky
Economists from Virginia
Wofford College faculty
Economic historians
University of Tennessee people
Federal Reserve economists
American economics writers
American male non-fiction writers
American economic historians
Earhart Foundation Fellows
Families from Kentucky